Cue sports at the 2009 Asian Indoor Games was held in Phan Đình Phùng Gymnasium, Ho Chi Minh City, Vietnam from 31 October to 7 November 2009.

Medalists

Men

Women

Medal table

Results

Men

One-cushion singles

Three-cushion singles

English billiards singles

Nine-ball singles

Snooker singles

Snooker team

Six-red snooker singles

Women

Eight-ball singles

Nine-ball singles

Six-red snooker singles

References 

 Cue Sports India

External links 
 Official site

2009 Asian Indoor Games events
Asian Indoor Games
Asian Indoor Games
2009
Cue sports in Vietnam